Kongunadu Makkal Desiya Katchi (KMDK) is a political party in the Indian state of Tamil Nadu. The party's vote base is mainly concentrated in western districts of Tamil Nadu. It was a splinter party of Kongunadu Munnetra Kazhagam (KMK)
The party has one Member of Parliament from Namakkal (Lok Sabha constituency) and his name is A. K. P. Chinraj. and One Member of TamilNadu Legislative assembly, E.R.Easwaran (2021 Tamil Nadu Legislative assembly election). The party has 4 district councilors and 10 union councilors

History
On 21 March 2013, E. R. Eswaran launched a new Political Party, Kongunadu Makkal Desiya Katchi (KMDK), from KMK after differences arose between him and KMK party president 'Best' Ramasamy. He also became the general secretary of KMDK. He contested the May 2009 Loksabha elections as a KMK candidate in the Coimbatore constituency and came third, securing 1.28 lakh votes. He also came third in the 2009 by election for Thondamuthur Assembly Constituency.

KMDK is considered as a Gounder based caste outfit with presence in western districts of Tamilnadu i.e. Kongu Region.

2021 Tamil Nadu State elections 
In 2021 elections, the party contested in Secular Progressive Alliance in 3 constituencies Kongu Nadu Region (Thiruchengode, Perundurai and  Sulur constituencies).

KMDK general seceretary E.R.Easwaran won in Thriuchengode securing 81,688 votes (44.23%). The other two seats were lost

2019 Lok Sabha election 
The party has contested the 2019 Lok Sabha elections as part of United Progressive Alliance led by the DMK in Tamil Nadu.

KMDK got Namakkal Lok Sabha Constituency Namakkal, a constituency known for concentrated Gounder population. KMDK had fielded AKP Chinnaraj, the President of Tamilnadu Poultry Farmers Association in DMK's Rising Sun symbol.

The KMDK Candidate Won By a big margin (55.24%) in 2019 elections as the result announced and the party men celebrated their first ever electoral win since the launch of the party in Namakkal.

Also KMDK is considered to be played a pivotal role for the win of DMK in Kongu region which has been known as ADMK fort

2016 Tamil Nadu State elections
In 2016 elections, the party contested alone in 72 constituencies predominantly in Kongu Nadu Region (Krishnagiri, Dharmapuri, Salem, Namakkal, Karur, Erode, Tiruppur, Dindugal, Coimbatore and Nilgiris districts of Tamilnadu).

KMDK lost in all 72 Assembly seats contested but polled 1. 70 Lakh votes.

2014 Lok Sabha election 
The party contested the 2014 Lok Sabha alliance as a part of National Democratic Alliance led by the BJP. Party General Secretary E. R. Eswaran contested in Pollachi Lok Sabha, the lone seat allotted for the party from the alliance and finished second with 276,118 votes.

See also 
 Kongu Nadu Statehood movement

References

2013 establishments in Tamil Nadu
Former member parties of the National Democratic Alliance
Member parties of the United Progressive Alliance
Organisations based in Coimbatore
Political parties established in 2009
Political parties in Tamil Nadu